Wilms tumor protein (WT33) is a protein that in humans is encoded by the WT1 gene on chromosome 11p.

Function 

This gene encodes a transcription factor that contains four zinc finger motifs at the C-terminus and a proline / glutamine-rich DNA-binding domain at the N-terminus. It has an essential role in the normal development of the urogenital system, and it is mutated in a subset of patients with Wilms' tumor, the gene's namesake. Multiple transcript variants, resulting from alternative splicing at two coding exons, have been well characterized. There is also evidence for the use of non-AUG (CUG) translation initiation site upstream of, and in-frame with the first AUG, leading to additional isoforms.

Structure 

The WT1 gene product shows similarity to the zinc fingers of the mammalian growth regulated early growth response protein 1 (EGR1) and (EGR2) proteins.

Clinical significance 

Mutations of Wilms' tumor suppressor gene1 (WT1) are associated with embryonic malignancy of the kidney, affecting around 1-9 in 100,000 infants. It occurs in both sporadic and hereditary forms. Inactivation of WT1 causes Wilms tumour, and Denys-Drash syndrome (DDS),  leading to nephropathy and genital abnormalities. The WT1 protein has been found to bind a host of cellular factors, e.g. p53, a known tumor suppressor. Despite the name, WT1 mutation is found in only about 5-10% of Wilms Tumor cases. Some other genes associated with this disease are BRCA2 and GPC3

WT1 is mutated in a mutually exclusive manner with TET2, IDH1, and IDH2 in acute myeloid leukemia. TET2 can be recruited by WT1 to its target genes and activates WT1-target genes by converting 5mC into 5hmC residues at the genes’ promoters, representing an important feature of a new regulatory WIT pathway linked to the development of AML.

The serine protease HtrA2 binds to WT1 and it cleaves WT1 at multiple sites following the treatment with cytotoxic drugs.

Using immunohistochemistry, WT1 protein can be demonstrated in the cell nuclei of 75% of mesotheliomas and in 93% of ovarian serous carcinomas, as well as in benign mesothelium and fallopian tube epithelium. This allows these tumours to be distinguished from other, similar, cancers, such as adenocarcinoma. Antibodies to the WT1 protein, however, also frequently cross-react with cytoplasmic proteins in a variety of benign and malignant cells, so that only nuclear staining can be considered diagnostic.

Mutation in WT1 causes  predisposition to hernias.

As a drug target

A vaccine that induces an acquired immune response against WT1 is in clinical trials for various cancers. T cell therapies (TCR-T) are also being tested in clinical trials for leukemia.

Disease monitoring 
WT1 gene is overexpressed in case of hematological malignancies. This fact is widely used for disease monitoring - evaluations of treatment success, as well as relapse or remission post-treatment checks. Preferably quantitative polymerase chain reaction (qPCR) is used to establish the levels of WT1 expression. The rising level of WT1 expression is significantly connected with disease progression and relapse of the proliferative disorder. WT1 as a marker is used as a "golden standard" for monitoring of acute myeloid leukemia, however other hematological malignancies such as chronic myeloid leukemia or myeloproliferative syndrome can manifest with overexpressed WT1 and for in specific cases WT1 monitoring can be used even in patients diagnosed with those types of cancer.

Interactions 

WT1 has been shown to interact with TET2, U2AF2, PAWR, UBE2I and WTAP. In combination with Cited2 activates WT1 the Steroidogenic factor 1

RNA editing 

There is some evidence for RNA editing of human WT1 mRNA. As with alternative splicing of the gene RNA editing increases the number of isoforms of this protein.

Editing is tissue specific and developmentally regulated. Editing shown to be restricted in testis and kidney in the rat. Editing of this gene product has been found to occur in mice and rats as well as humans.

Editing type 

The editing site is found at nucleotide position 839 found in exon 6 of the gene. It causes a codon change from a Proline codon (CCC) to a Leucine codon (CUC)

The type of editing is a uridine to cytidine (U to C) base change. The editing reaction is thought to be an amidation of uridine which converts it to a cytidine. The relevance of this editing is unknown as is the enzyme responsible for this editing. The region where editing occurs like that of other editing sites, e.g., ApoB mRNA editing is conserved. Mice, rats and humans have conserved sequences flanking the editing site consisting of 10 nucleotides before the editing site and four after the site.

Effects of editing 

RNA editing results in an alternative amino acid being translated. The changes in amino acid occur in a region identified as a domain involved in transcription activation function.

Editing has been shown to decrease repressive regulation of transcription of growth promoting genes in vitro compared to the non edited protein. Although the physiological role of editing has yet to be determined, suggestions have been made that editing may play a role in the pathogenesis of Wilms tumour.

Experimental models 
WT1 gene can be found as well in the genome of mice. The mouse model with a WT1 knock-out shows symptoms corresponding to human pathophysiology. The mice were observed to have defects of urogenital tract similar to cases patients when WT1 signalling has been malfunctioning. The mouse had absent kidneys as their development failed during embryonic stages. This suggests that WT1 is unconditionally required for a proper kidney formation and development.

Apart from that, the WT1 knock-out mice lacked several types of glands, such as gonads or adrenal glands. The effect of the knock-out was as well visible on heart and blood circulation - several abnormalities concerning heart and diaphragm, as well as troubles with swelling and lymph circulation were described. Due to those defects, the mouse died before it was even born.

Mouse model is used to study some specific disorder connected with WT1 expression, too, such as acute myeloid leukemia. To examine the expression levels and localisation of WT1, a mouse model using WT1-GFP (green fluorescent protein) knock-in has been made. This model showed, that WT1 is significantly overexpressed in leukemic cells compared to none or minor expression in normal untransformed cells from bone marrow, either hematopoietic stem cells or hematopoietic progenitors and precursors.

References

Further reading

External links 
  GeneReviews/NCBI/NIH/UW entry on Aniridia
 OMIM entries on Aniridia
 GeneReviews/NIH/NCBI/UW entry on Wilms Tumor Overview